Zoe Morgan may refer to:

Zoe Morgan, character in the television series Hunted
Zoe Morgan, character in the novel In the King's Service
Zoe Morgan, character in the television series Person of Interest